Seaforth Sands was a terminus station located on the Liverpool Overhead Railway at Seaforth, west of Crosby Road South, Knowsley Road and Rimrose Road junctions.

History
The station opened on 30 April 1894, as a northern extension from Alexandra Dock with a total cost of £10,000. In 1901 the country's second moving escalator was installed in the station. The escalator was later removed, in 1906, due to multiple occurrences of long skirts becoming trapped in the machinery.

With the LOR's second northern extension to Seaforth & Litherland on 2 July 1905, a 'through' station was built alongside the terminus. The original terminus platforms remained in use until 1925 when they were demolished and replaced by a large carriage shed.

It was the last overhead station before the junction with the North Mersey Branch. The weight gauge meant that while LOR trains could operate on the Lancashire and Yorkshire Railway electrified network, the reverse was not true.

As LOR trains ran at a lower voltage than the Lancashire and Yorkshire electric trains, LOR trains were permitted to operate with their motors in series mode only on the North Mersey Branch.

The station was victim to a serious arson attack on 4 February 1956; the attack occurred overnight, with evidence of an old tyre having been found inside the station building. Fifty firemen fought the fire, which consumed two trains and damaged the station buildings, bringing it under control within an hour. The total damage caused was around £30,000 and required the complete rebuilding of one of the platform buildings.

The station closed, along with the rest of the line, on 30 December 1956. No evidence of this station remains.

References

External links
Seaforth Sands railway station at Disused Stations

Disused railway stations in the Metropolitan Borough of Sefton
Former Liverpool Overhead Railway stations
Railway stations in Great Britain opened in 1894
Railway stations in Great Britain closed in 1956